

Women's 50 m Freestyle - Final

Women's 50 m Freestyle - Semifinals

Women's 50 m Freestyle - Semifinal 01

Women's 50 m Freestyle - Semifinal 02

Women's 50 m Freestyle - Heats

Women's 50 m Freestyle - Heat 01

Women's 50 m Freestyle - Heat 02

Women's 50 m Freestyle - Heat 03

Women's 50 m Freestyle - Heat 04

Women's 50 m Freestyle - Heat 05

Women's 50 m Freestyle - Heat 06

References

Swimming competitions in Australia
50 metres freestyle
2006 in women's swimming